Sunan station is a railway station in Sunan-guyŏk, P'yŏngyang, North Korea. It is on located on the P'yŏngŭi Line of the Korean State Railway. 

It is the closest station to the terminal building of P'yŏngyang International Airport, which is located about 800 metres from the station.

References

Railway stations in North Korea